La Mesa Park was a horse racing track in Raton, New Mexico. The track hosted both Thoroughbred and Quarter Horse racing. When La Mesa opened in 1946 it was the first horse racing track in New Mexico. La Mesa Park  closed in 1992.

References

Horse racing venues in New Mexico
Tourist attractions in Colfax County, New Mexico
Buildings and structures in Colfax County, New Mexico
Raton, New Mexico
Defunct sports venues in New Mexico
Defunct horse racing venues in the United States
1946 establishments in New Mexico
1992 disestablishments in New Mexico
Sports venues completed in 1946